Oedipodium is the only genus of moss in the family Oedipodiaceae. It contains the single species Oedipodium griffithianum, the gouty-moss or Griffith's oedipodium moss. This species is distributed in cooler climates of Eurasia, as well as from Alaska, Washington state, British Columbia, Yukon, Greenland, Newfoundland, Tierra del Fuego and the Falkland Islands.

The relationship of Oedipodium to other mosses has been much debated.  Previously, the taxon has been included with the Funariales or the Splachnales.  However, characteristics of the protonemata and asexual propagation, along with molecular evidence, point to a closer relationship with the Tetraphidaceae.

References

Monotypic moss genera
Flora of Alaska
Flora of Yukon
Flora of British Columbia
Flora of Greenland
Flora of southern Chile
Flora of South Argentina
Flora of the Falkland Islands
Mosses